The 4th Northwest Territories Legislative Council was the 11th assembly of the territorial government. It lasted from 1960 to 1964.

References

External links
Northwest Territories Legislative Assembly homepage

Northwest Territories Legislative Assemblies